The discography of Argentine pop rock band Erreway who were active between 2002 and 2007 consists of three studio albums, two compilation albums, one live albums and thirteen official singles. Consisting of four leading actors from the television series Rebelde Way — Camila Bordonaba, Felipe Colombo, Luisana Lopilato and Benjamín Rojas — the band functioned actively from 2002 to 2005, selling approximately 10million units worldwide. Several attempts of reunion were unsuccessful, and a new album Vuelvo, recorded by Bordonaba, Colombo and Rojas, has never been released.

Albums

Studio albums

Live albums

Compilation albums

Box sets

Singles

Official singles

Other releases

Music videos

References 

Discographies of Argentine artists
Pop music group discographies